Estradiol valerate/testosterone enanthate (EV/TE), sold under the brand names Primodian Depot and Ditate among others, is an injectable combination medication of estradiol valerate (EV), an estrogen, and testosterone enanthate (TE), an androgen/anabolic steroid, which is used in menopausal hormone therapy for women. The medication is also used to suppress lactation in postpartum women (brand name Deladumone).

Ditate was provided in the form of multi-use 10 mL vials containing 4 mg/mL EV and 90 mg/mL TE in an oil solution and was administered by intramuscular injection at regular intervals. Conversely, another preparation, Ditate-DS, was provided in the form of single-use 2 mL vials containing 8 mg/mL EV and 180 mg/mL TE in an oil solution, and was administered as a single intramuscular injection. Another product, Primodian 
Depot, was provided in the form of 1 mL ampoules containing 4 mg/mL EV (3.0 mg/mL free estradiol) and 90.3 mg/mL TE (65 mg/mL free testosterone) in an oil solution, and was administered by intramuscular injection once every 4 to 6 weeks. The elimination half-life of EV in oil by intramuscular injection is approximately 4 or 5 days. Similarly, the elimination half-life of TE in oil by intramuscular injection is approximately 4 or 5 days. EV/TE reportedly has a duration of about 21 days.

Deladumone OB was a double-dosage formulation of Deladumone, which was intended to provide the same dosage with a smaller injection volume.

Primodian Depot was introduced for medical use by 1955. An oral tablet product with the similar brand name of Primodian, containing ethinylestradiol and methyltestosterone, was marketed around the same time, and should not be confused with the injectable Primodian Depot. EV/TE was discontinued in the United States by 2011. EV/TE has been discontinued in most other countries as well, but formulations of EV/TE continue to be marketed in a few countries, including Japan, Mexico, Peru, and Taiwan.

See also
 List of combined sex-hormonal preparations

References

Combined estrogen–androgen formulations